Who Killed Lt. Van Dorn? is an American documentary film released in 2018.

Description 
The documentary examines the events leading up to and immediately after the 2014 crash of a Sikorsky MH-53E Sea Dragon off Cape Henry, Virginia. Three crew members perished in the crash, among them Lieutenant Wes Van Dorn. The documentary exposed widespread reliability issues across both Navy and Marine Corp 53E fleets.

The reporting for the documentary included collaborations with the Virginian-Pilot, NBC News, and Honolulu Civil Beat. It was directed by Zachary Stauffer.

Reception  
The documentary was screened at the Mill Valley Film Fest with the Mercury News calling it "A high point in the fest’s documentary category" and the San Francisco Chronicle calling it "A solid piece of investigative journalism." The film was favorably reviewed by Film Threat.

The Nation magazine called the film "a compelling story of how the dysfunction and greed of the military-industrial complex put US military personnel at risk, often with fatal consequences...
Every concerned citizen and every member of Congress should see this film. Lives depend on it."

The documentary was poorly received by Navy and Marine Corp senior officers, who declined to cooperate and described the documentary as "garbage journalism".

Awards 
 Audience Favorite, Mill Valley Film Festival, 2018
 Best Documentary, Monarch Film Festival, 2018
 Audience Award, RiverRun International Film Festival, 2019
 Best Documentary, Columbus International Film & Animation Festival, 2019
 Special Jury Award, Workers Unite Film Festival, 2019
 First Time Filmmaker Award, Newburyport Documentary Film Festival, 2019
 Best Feature Doc, Jacksonville Film Festival, 2019

Festival selections 
2019
 Jacksonville Film Festival
 Alexandria Film Festival
 San Francisco Veterans Film Festival
 Ojai Film Festival
 United Nations Association Film Festival
 Louisville's International Festival of Film
 Chagrin Documentary Film Fest
 Golden Door International Film Festival
 Niagara Falls International Film Festival
 Newburyport Documentary Film Festival
 DOCUTAH International Documentary Film Festival
 San Antonio Film Festival
 New Haven Documentary Film Festival
 DUMBO Film Festival
 The Workers Unite Film Festival
 Newport Beach Film Festival
 Columbus International Film & Animation Festival
 RiverRun International Film Festival
 Annapolis Film Festival
 Fargo Film Festival
 San Luis Obispo International Film Festival
 Sedona International Film Festival

2018
 Monarch Film Festival
 Mill Valley Film Festival

References

External links 
 
 
 Reveal from the Center for Investigative Reporting long form radio story 

American documentary films
2018 films
2018 documentary films
Documentary films about aviation accidents or incidents
2010s American films